"Glorious" is a song by Swedish singer-songwriter Andreas Johnson, released as a single in 1999 on the WEA label. It is from his second album Liebling. The song peaked within the top 10 of the charts in Italy and the United Kingdom.

"Glorious" was used as the main theme for Sky Sports Premier League shows Ford Super Sunday and Ford Football Special from August 2000 to May 2001. The song was later used on television advertisements for Vauxhall, Volvo, and in 2004, for Nutella, thus allowing the song to re-enter the French Singles Chart at a peak of number 16.

Track listings 
CD single
 "Glorious" — 3:29
 "Submerged" — 8:33
	
CD maxi
 "Glorious" — 3:27
 "Submerged" — 4:41
 "Honeydrop" — 3:49

CD maxi (US release)
 "Glorious (Num Edit)" — 3:44
 "Glorious (Num Club Mix)" — 9:23
 "Glorious (Num Dub)" — 8:05
 "Glorious (Hybrid Mix)" — 9:44
 "Glorious (Ice Pop Remix)" — 5:42
 "Glorious (Mystic Slow Remix)" — 4:21
 Contains two videos of "Glorious (Original Version)" and "Glorious (Num Edit)"
 Track 1-3 Remixed by Hani
 Track 4 Remixed by Mike Truman for Distinctive Breaks
 Track 5, 6 Artistic Production and Arrangement by Domenico Capuano

Charts

Weekly charts

Year-end charts

Certifications

Release history

References 

1999 songs
1999 singles
Andreas Johnson songs
Songs written by Andreas Johnson
Warner Music Group singles

sv:Glorious (sång)